Sergio Doménech (born 1 January 1976) is a Spanish judoka.

Achievements

External links

1976 births
Living people
Spanish male judoka
Mediterranean Games silver medalists for Spain
Mediterranean Games medalists in judo
Competitors at the 1997 Mediterranean Games
Place of birth missing (living people)
20th-century Spanish people